The , signed as Route 11, is one of the routes of the Hanshin Expressway system serving the Keihanshin area in Japan.

Route description

The Ikeda Route begins at Nakanoshima Junction in Nishi-ku, Osaka, where it meets the Loop Route. Curving to the north just south of Osaka Station, the expressway serves the station and the Umeda commercial, business, shopping, and entertainment district. The southbound exit ramp to the area is the Ikeda Route's most notable feature, an exit ramp that passes through the Gate Tower Building, taking up part of the building's fifth, sixth, and seventh floors.
 
From there it travels northwest from central Osaka, crossing the Yodo River. After this, the expressway crosses through the city's Nishiyodogawa and Yodogawa wards, then it crosses into the city of Toyonaka where it curves to the north. In Toyonaka it meets the Meishin Expressway at Toyonaka Interchange. Approaching the vicinity of Itami Airport, it slowly begins to curve to the northwest again. An interchange connects the airport to the expressway. Just north of the airport interchange, the spur route of the Ikeda Route begins, heading northwest, while the main route meets its northern terminus just beyond the junction. The main route ends at an at-grade intersection with National Route 176 and Osaka Prefecture Route 10 just south of the Ikeda Interchange on the Chūgoku Expressway.

History
The first section of what come to be known as the Ikeda Route opened in 1965 between the Loop Route and Umeda. The spur of the Ikeda Route was completed in 1998.

List of interchanges
The entire expressway lies within Osaka Prefecture.

Spur route
The Ikeda Route has a spur route that travels north from its southern terminus with the main route of the Ikeda Route at Hotarugaike Junction in Toyonaka to its northern terminus at National Route 173 in Ikeda.

Route description
The spur of the Ikeda Route begins at Hotarugaike Junction in Toyonaka where it meets its parent route. The expressway travels around the northeastern edge of Itami Airport, briefly crossing into Itami, Hyōgo before crossing back into the city of Ikeda in Osaka Prefecture. The expressway then begins paralleling the Ina River as it travels north toward Kawanishi, once again briefly switching to the opposite shore of the river in Hyōgo Prefecture, before returning into Osaka. The route meets its northern terminus at an interchange with national routes 173 and 423 just north of Satsukiyama Zoo.

List of interchanges

See also

References

External links

Roads in Osaka Prefecture
Roads in Hyōgo Prefecture
11
1965 establishments in Japan